Gungtang,
or Kotang, 
called Gongdang by China, is a village and township in the Gyirong County in the Shigatse Prefecture, Tibet region of China.

In addition to Gungtang, the township contains three villages: Ru, Tsang (Zhang village) and Kangpo (Kangbei village).

See also
List of towns and villages in Tibet

Notes

References

Gyirong County
Populated places in Shigatse
Township-level divisions of Tibet